The ahdath were local militias or irregular police found in Syria in the 10th to 12th centuries. The ahdath maintained order and protected cities from outside domination. Though some later writers ascribed proletarian values to the ahdath as outlets of the popular will, many ahdath also fulfilled a more formal police function and, in many cases, worked in conjunction with the urban bourgeoisie. The ahdath were used by the Fatimid dynasty in Syria against attacks from the Crusaders.

References 

Medieval Syria
Military history of the Fatimid Caliphate
Crusades
Militias in Asia
Historical law enforcement occupations